Heart Shaped World may refer to:

 Heart Shaped World (Chris Isaak album), 1989
 Heart Shaped World (Jessica Andrews album), 1999